USJ 7 station is an integrated transit station located at USJ 7, Subang Jaya, Selangor. USJ 7 is served by the LRT Kelana Jaya Line and the BRT Sunway Line. This station is named after the USJ 7 neighbourhood, which is located east of the station.

This station was opened when the BRT Sunway Line started serving this station on 2 June 2015. Later, the LRT Kelana Jaya Line portion of the station opened on 30 June 2016. The station acts as an interchange station for the BRT and LRT lines.

Gallery

Bus Services

Feeder buses

Other buses

Around the station
Da Men Mall
The Summit USJ
Segi College Subang

References

External links 
USJ7 LRT station

2016 establishments in Malaysia
Bus rapid transit in Malaysia
Kelana Jaya Line
Railway stations opened in 2016
Subang Jaya